Fireside Theatre, a.k.a. Jane Wyman Presents, is an American anthology drama series that ran on NBC from 1949 to 1958, and was the first successful filmed series on American television. Productions were low budget and often based on public domain stories or written by freelance writers such as Rod Serling.

Series overview

Episodes

Season 1 (1949)

Season 2 (1949–50)

Season 3 (1950–51)

Season 4 (1951–52)

Season 5 (1952–53)

Season 6 (1953–54)

Season 7 (1954–55)

Directors 
Sidney Lanfield, many episodes

John Ford, The Bamboo Cross

Jacques Tourneur, A Hero Returns, (25 mn) (O2/1956)

Jacques Tourneur, Kirsti, (25 mn) (02/1956)

Jacques Tourneur, The Miror, (25 mn) (02/1956)

References

External links
  

Fireside Theatre